William Christian Jensen (November 17, 1889 – March 27, 1917) was a Major League Baseball pitcher.

Sources

Major League Baseball pitchers
Detroit Tigers players
Philadelphia Athletics players
Baseball players from Philadelphia
1889 births
1917 deaths